Lisa Jane Vanderpump (born 15 September 1960) is an English television personality, businesswoman and actress. Since 2013, she has been a main cast member on Vanderpump Rules. From 2010 to 2019, she was an original main cast member on The Real Housewives of Beverly Hills. In 2021, she hosted Overserved with Lisa Vanderpump. Later that year, she was featured in Vanderpump Dogs.

Vanderpump and her husband, Ken Todd, have owned 36 restaurants, bars and clubs across the United Kingdom and the United States, including The Shadow Lounge, Bar Soho, SUR Restaurant & Lounge, Villa Blanca, Pump Restaurant, Tom Tom Restaurant & Bar, Vanderpump Cocktail Garden and Vanderpump à Paris.

Early life 
Lisa Jane Vanderpump was born in Dulwich, London, on 15 September 1960, the younger of the two children of ad agency art director John Vanderpump and his wife, Jean. Vanderpump's older brother was DJ and businessman, Mark Vanderpump.

Vanderpump started ballet lessons at three, and attended Riverston School in Lee Green, South London. Vanderpump was enrolled in the Corona Academy drama school, at the age of nine.

By the age of 19, Vanderpump had bought herself a flat in Fulham, West London. Vanderpump was financially self-sufficient after leaving home, with "just a good education and a kick in the arse."

Career

Entertainment 
At the age of 13, Vanderpump made her film debut as an uncredited extra in the 1973 romantic comedy A Touch of Class, playing Julia Allessio, the daughter of Glenda Jackson's character.

Throughout the 1970s, 1980s, and 1990s, Vanderpump had small roles in various episodic television programmes including Silk Stalkings and Baywatch Nights.

Vanderpump was featured in the 1980s music videos "Poison Arrow" and "Mantrap" by the band ABC and "(What) In The Name of Love" by the duo Naked Eyes. She was featured in the 2014 music video for "G.U.Y." by Lady Gaga.

Vanderpump has done over 100 commercials for brands including Maltesers, Lilt, Britvic 55 and Hamlet cigars.

In October 2010, Vanderpump debuted in Bravo's The Real Housewives of Beverly Hills and is an original cast member of the series. On 3 June 2019, she announced her departure from the show after nine seasons.

Since January 2013, Vanderpump has been a cast member in a spin-off of The Real Housewives of Beverly Hills, Vanderpump Rules, which focuses on the staff at her restaurants and bars; SUR Restaurant & Lounge, Pump Restaurant and Tom Tom Restaurant & Bar, in West Hollywood, California.

In March 2013, Vanderpump competed in the 16th season of Dancing with the Stars, partnered with professional dancer Gleb Savchenko. They were the second couple eliminated from the competition, leaving in tenth place, on 9 April.

In March 2021, Vanderpump was featured in E!'s Overserved with Lisa Vanderpump.

In June 2021, Vanderpump was featured in a second spin-off of The Real Housewives of Beverly Hills, Vanderpump Dogs, which focuses on Vanderpump and her staff as they run her dog foundation/rescue centre, Vanderpump Dogs.

Restaurants, bars and clubs 
Before moving to the US, Vanderpump designed 26 of the London-based restaurants, bars and clubs that she co-owned with her husband. The couple currently own three restaurants in California; SUR Restaurant & Lounge, the focus of The Real Housewives of Beverly Hills spin-off Vanderpump Rules, is based in West Hollywood along with Pump Restaurant and Tom Tom Restaurant & Bar.

In August 2009, Vanderpump opened her first restaurant in the United States, Villa Blanca. In 2020, amid the COVID-19 pandemic, she announced Villa Blanca would be closing.

In March 2019, Vanderpump opened her first Las Vegas venue, Vanderpump Cocktail Garden located in Caesars Palace.

In April 2022, Vanderpump opened her second Las Vegas venue, Vanderpump à Paris located in the Paris Las Vegas casino hotel.

Beverages 
In February 2013, Vanderpump launched her first alcoholic beverage called Vanderpump Vodka.

In January 2014, Vanderpump launched her second alcoholic beverage called LVP Sangria, later rebranded to Vanderpump Sangria.

In April 2017, Vanderpump launched her first wine, Vanderpump Rosé.

In April 2020, after much success of her rosé and spinning her venture into Vanderpump Wines, Vanderpump launched Vanderpump Chardonnay and Vanderpump Cabernet.

Other ventures 
In November 2012, Vanderpump launched a lifestyle blog called Very Vanderpump.

In November 2014, Vanderpump released a line of homewares called the Vanderpump Beverly Hills Collection by Pop Culture Promotions.

In March 2017, Vanderpump was named editor-in-chief of Beverly Hills Lifestyle Magazine. In October 2018, Vanderpump departed her position as edition-in-chief of Beverly Hills Lifestyle Magazine.

In July 2019, Vanderpump partnered up with Nick Alain to launch a home collections line called Vanderpump Alain.

The Vanderpump Dog Foundation 

Vanderpump Dogs is an American 501(c)(3) dog rescue organisation.

After becoming aware of the Yulin Dog Meat Festival and witnessing the horrific images of slaughter and abuse that the dogs in Yulin, Shaanx face, Vanderpump and her husband Ken began the long journey towards trying to stop the barbaric torture practices in Yulin and end the dog meat trade in Asia.

In March 2017, Vanderpump opened the Vanderpump Dogs rescue centre, based in Los Angeles, California. She also has a foundation in China.

Charity work 
In July 2014, Vanderpump was honoured with a Golden Palm Star on the Palm Springs Walk of Stars.

In August 2015, Vanderpump was a recipient of the Ally Leadership Award from Equality California, an LGBT rights organisation.

In October 2015, Vanderpump organised a peaceful protest march against the Yulin Dog Meat Festival, the march went from MacArthur Park to the Chinese Consulate General in Los Angeles and started a movement to end the abuse, torture and slaughter of dogs worldwide. Together with her husband Ken and their partner, John Sessa, they launched the Stop Yulin Forever campaign. Vanderpump went on to address Congress about the same issues.

In March 2018, Vanderpump produced a documentary, The Road To Yulin… And Beyond, to draw attention to the Yulin Dog Meat Festival's barbaric practice and bring it to an end.

Personal life 
Vanderpump met her husband, businessman Ken Todd, at his first bar, Cork's Wine Bar in Kensington, London, in 1982. The couple wed on 28 August 1982, at a United Reformed Church. Together they have two children: a daughter, Pandora, and an adopted son, Max. She is stepmother to Warren Todd. Vanderpump has one grandson.

Vanderpump currently resides in Beverly Hills, California. She has lived in London, Cheltenham, Monaco, and the South of France. Vanderpump also owns a house in Montecito, California.

In 2011, she sold her Beverly Park house for $18.8 million and bought a $12 million house in the neighbourhood of Benedict Canyon.

In 2011, Vanderpump received the Key to the City of Beverly Hills by then-mayor Jimmy Delshad, who also declared March 1 'Lisa Vanderpump day', in recognition of her charitable and philanthropic work.

Filmography

Film and television

As herself

Published works

References

External links 

1960 births
Living people
Actresses from London
Businesspeople from London
English expatriates in the United States
English film actresses
English restaurateurs
English television actresses
English television personalities
Television personalities from London
The Real Housewives cast members
Women restaurateurs